Whitehead group in mathematics may mean:

 A group W with Ext(W, Z)=0; see Whitehead problem
 For a ring, the Whitehead group Wh(A) of a ring A, equal to 
 For a group, the Whitehead group Wh(G) of a group G, equal to K1(Z[G])/{±G}. Note that this is a quotient of the Whitehead group of the group ring.
 The Whitehead group Wh(A) of a simplicial complex or PL-manifold A, equal to Wh(π1(A)); see Whitehead torsion.

All named after J. H. C. Whitehead.